James Earl Lawson,  (October 21, 1891 – May 13, 1950) was a Canadian politician and lawyer.

Lawson was twice a candidate for the leadership of the Ontario Conservative Party, despite never being a member of the Legislative Assembly of Ontario, and once as a candidate for the federal Tory leadership.

His first run for the provincial leadership was in 1920 but was defeated by George Howard Ferguson.

He moved on to federal politics and was elected to the House of Commons of Canada as a Conservative MP in a 1928 by-election representing York West. Lawson was appointed to the cabinet of Prime Minister R.B. Bennett in  August 1935 as Minister of National Revenue. He lost this position when the Conservatives were defeated in the fall 1935 election but he was elected to the House of Commons, this time representing York South.

Lawson was the "old guard" candidate at the 1938 Conservative leadership convention but placed last after many of his delegates decided to support  M. A. MacPherson in an unsuccessful attempt to stop Robert James Manion from becoming leader.

In 1938, several months following his failed attempt to win the federal leadership, he placed second to George Drew at the Ontario party's provincial leadership convention.

Lawson retired from the House of Commons in 1940, but remained active in the party. He was the mover of the successful 1942 motion to change the name of the Conservative Party to the Progressive Conservative Party of Canada.

External links
 

1891 births
1950 deaths
Canadian people of Scottish descent
Conservative Party of Canada (1867–1942) MPs
Members of the House of Commons of Canada from Ontario
Members of the King's Privy Council for Canada
Members of the United Church of Canada
Politicians from Hamilton, Ontario